Abdamon (also transliterated Abdamun ; , was a Phoenician King of Sidon ( – ), and a vassal of the Achaemenid Empire. He was succeeded by his son Baana to the throne of Sidon.

References

Citations

Sources 
 
 
 
 
 
 
 
 
 
 
 
 
 
 
 
 
 
 
 
 

Kings of Sidon

5th-century BC rulers